Charles Duncan may refer to:

Politics and law
 Charles T. Duncan (1838–1915), American lawyer and Virginia state judge
 Charles Duncan (politician) (1865–1933), British politician and trade unionist
 Charles Duncan Jr. (1926–2022), U.S. Secretary of Energy under President Jimmy Carter

Others
 Charles Duncan (captain) ( 1786–1789), British ship captain and maritime fur trader
 Charles Duncan (stonemason) (1823–1891), Scottish-born Utah stonemason
 Charles Duncan (artist) (1887–1970), American avant-garde painter
 Charlie Duncan (1889–?), Scottish footballer
 Charles Stafford Duncan (1892–1952), American painter
 Charles K. Duncan (1911–1994), United States Navy admiral
 Charles "Scottie" Duncan (fl. 1937–1940), American baseball player
 Charles Duncan (British Army soldier) (1920–1943), British soldier posthumously awarded the George Cross